Uderns is a municipality in the Schwaz district in the Austrian state of Tyrol.

Geography
Uderns lies between Fügen and Ried in the heart of the Ziller valley.

References

Cities and towns in Schwaz District